Matt Koart (born November 28, 1963 in Goleta, California) is a former defensive end in the National Football League.

Career
Koart was drafted by the Green Bay Packers in the fifth round of the 1986 NFL Draft and played that season with the team. He played at the collegiate level at the University of Southern California.

See also
List of Green Bay Packers players

References

1963 births
Living people
American football defensive ends
Green Bay Packers players
USC Trojans football players
People from Goleta, California
Sportspeople from Santa Barbara County, California
Players of American football from California